Sjøholt is a village in Ålesund Municipality in Møre og Romsdal county, Norway. Sjøholt is located roughly halfway between the towns of Ålesund and Molde, along European route E39 and European route E136.

The village is home to furniture, wood, and plastics industries. The regional high school and Ørskog Church are also located here. The newspaper Bygdebladet is published in Sjøholt.

The village was the administrative centre of the old Ørskog Municipality until 2020.

References

Villages in Møre og Romsdal
Ålesund